Larkinia is a genus of saltwater clams in the family Arcidae, the ark clams.

Species
Species within the genus Larkinia include:
Larkinia grandis  (Broderip & G. B. Sowerby I, 1829) 
Larkinia multicostata  (G. B. Sowerby I, 1833)

References

Arcidae
Bivalve genera